Fenjan (also Romanized as Fenjān) is a village in Simakan Rural District, in the Central District of Bavanat County, Fars Province, Iran. At the 2006 census, its population was 419, in 116 families.

References 

Populated places in Bavanat County